Frederick Kann (1886–1965) was an American painter and founding member of the American Abstract Artists.

Biography
Kann was born on May 25, 1886 in Gablonz, Bohemia (then in the Austro-Hungarian Empire). He studied at the Czech Technical University in Prague, the Academy of Fine Arts, Prague and the Academy of Fine Arts, Munich. In 1920 he moved to New York where he worked as a commercial artist. He became a naturalized U.S. citizen the same year. He then moved to Paris, returning to the United States in 1936 to begin his teaching career at the Kansas City Art Institute. 

He was a cofounder of the American Abstract Artists in 1936. In 1939 his work was included in the Galerie Charpentier's exhibition Realites Nouvelles Renaissance Plastique.

In 1943 Kann moved to Los Angeles. There he worked to promote Abstract artists' work by establishing the Circle Gallery, and co-found the Modern Institute of Art. In 1953 he started the Kann Institute of Art.

He died on July 6, 1965 in Los Angeles, California.

References

External links
images of Kann's work on Mid-Centuria

1886 births
1965 deaths 
20th-century American artists
Austro-Hungarian emigrants to the United States